William Lorimer Hall (July 28, 1876 – May 26, 1958) was a lawyer, judge and political figure in Nova Scotia, Canada. He presided over Viola Desmond's appeal. He represented Queen's County in the Nova Scotia House of Assembly as a Conservative member from 1910 to 1920 and from 1925 to 1931.

He was born in Melvern Square, Nova Scotia, the son of Reverend William Hall and Margaret Barss. Hall was educated at Acadia University and Dalhousie University. He was called to the Nova Scotia bar in 1900 and set up practice in Halifax. In 1907, Hall married Edith Hamm. He served as Attorney General in the province's Executive Council from 1926 to 1931. In 1931, Hall was named a judge in the Supreme Court of Nova Scotia. He served on the bench until his death in Halifax.

His daughter Mary married Robert Stanfield, the 17th Premier of Nova Scotia.

References

1876 births
1958 deaths
Progressive Conservative Association of Nova Scotia MLAs
Judges in Nova Scotia
Nova Scotia political party leaders